Vignone is a comune (municipality) in the Province of Verbano-Cusio-Ossola in the Italian region Piedmont, located about  northeast of Turin and about  northeast of Verbania.

Vignone borders the following municipalities: Arizzano, Bee, Cambiasca, Caprezzo, Intragna, Premeno, Verbania.

Demographic evolution

References

Cities and towns in Piedmont